Loneliness of Leila (Persian: تنهایی لیلا‎, romanized: Tanhaei Leila) is a 2015 Iranian drama television series directed by Mohammad Hossein Latifi and written by Hamed Angha, which aired on IRIB TV3 from 25 July to 1 September 2015 for 30 episodes.

Plot 
Leila, a girl from a wealthy and unreligious background gets in love with a religious guy, Mohammad, and puts him in special circumstances and tests his faith. Leila also had a fiancé, but her love for Muhammad completely transforms her and strengthens her faith. She marries Muhammad and has a child together but Muhammad suffers from a previous stroke. He dies and this is the beginning of the story of Leila's problems.

Cast 
Mina Sadati as Leila

Hasan Pourshirazi as Khosrow

Nasrin Moghanloo as Nasrin

Behrouz Shoeibi as Mohammad

Borzou Arjmand as Latif

Andishe Fooladvand as Katy

Sam Gharibian as Shayan

Reza Rooygari as Leila's Father

Hassan Joharchi as Leila's Uncle

Ali Salehi as Shayan's Lawyer

Javad Hashemi

References 

2010s Iranian television series
2015 Iranian television series debuts
2015 Iranian television series endings
2010s drama television series
Islamic Republic of Iran Broadcasting original programming